Sarah Kagingo (born 1978) is a Ugandan businesswoman, communication specialist and politician.  Currently she serves as the Principal Press Secretary at the Parliament of Uganda. She is the managing director of SoftPower Digital Communication Ltd.

Early life and education background
Kagingo was born in 1978 in Kajara village, Ntungamo District, She went to Trinity College Nabingo for UCE and Mt St Mary's College Namagunga for UACE.
She received his Bachelor of Library and Information Science from Makerere University.

Career
In 1997, Kagingo was voted as a Guild President for Makerere University 1997–1998 becoming the second female candidate to win the guild presidency since Makerere University was founded in 1922. 
She has served in various organizations such as a research assistant and later as a public relations officer at Divinity Union Limited a non government organization,  as  the Head of Research at Akiba International.  In 2013, Kagingo was appointed as a Presidential Assistant for Communication (2011-2014.).  She  was in charge of Communication and public affairs at Operation Wealth Creation (2015-2017). 
She is the managing director of SoftPower Digital Communication Ltd as well she is the chief editor of SoftPower News an online news website based in Kampala Uganda.
On 3 August 2021, Kagingo was appointed as the new Principal Press Secretary of the Speaker of the Parliament of Uganda.

Politics
In 2012 and 2017, she  contested for EALA Member of Parliament seat on the NRM ticket unfortunately she lost.

Other considerations
She is the former president of Uganda's Public Relations Body (2018–2020).  Kagingo serves as a board member at PSFU, an Exco member of the National Association of Broadcasters

References

1978 births
Living people
National Resistance Movement politicians
Makerere University alumni
People from Ntungamo District
21st-century Ugandan women politicians
21st-century Ugandan politicians